The Woodcliff Burials are an archaeological site located near Inglewood, Nebraska, United States.  Located in the middle of farmland, the site was added to the National Register of Historic Places in 1973.

References

Archaeological sites on the National Register of Historic Places in Nebraska
Geography of Saunders County, Nebraska
National Register of Historic Places in Saunders County, Nebraska
Plains Woodland period